Kobroor is an island in the Aru Islands in the Arafura Sea. It is situated in the Maluku Province, Indonesia. Its area is 1723 km². The other main islands in the archipelago are Tanahbesar (also called Wokam), Kola, Maikoor, Koba and Trangan.

References 

Aru Islands
Islands of the Maluku Islands
Uninhabited islands of Indonesia